Mock Turtle is a fictional character from Alice's Adventures in Wonderland.

Mock turtle, Mockturtle  or Mock Turtle(s) may refer to:

 Mock turtle soup
 8889 Mockturtle, a minor planet named after the fictional character
 Mock Turtles (opera), 1881
 The Mock Turtles, an English indie rock band
 Mock turtle neck, a garment style